The Haldeman Voting House No. 8, on Kentucky Route 174 near Morehead, Kentucky, was built in 1935.  The  voting house was listed on the National Register of Historic Places in 1998.

It is built of fieldstone and flush mortar.  It was built by the Works Progress Administration.

See also 
 Brushy Voting House No. 6
 National Register of Historic Places listings in Rowan County, Kentucky

References

Voting houses
National Register of Historic Places in Rowan County, Kentucky
Government buildings completed in 1935
1935 establishments in Kentucky
Works Progress Administration in Kentucky
Government buildings on the National Register of Historic Places in Kentucky
Kentucky elections